Lestes plagiatus is a species of damselfly in the family Lestidae, the spreadwings. It is known commonly as the highlands spreadwing, common spreadwing, and stream spreadwing.

This species is native to much of the southern half of Africa, where it is widespread. It is recorded in Angola, Botswana, Kenya, Malawi, Mozambique, Nigeria, South Africa, Sudan, Tanzania, Uganda, Zambia, Zimbabwe, and possibly Burundi.

This damselfly lives near pools, swamps, and streams.

References

External links 

 Lestes virgatus on African Dragonflies and Damselflies Online

P
Odonata of Africa
Arthropods of Southern Africa
Insects of South Africa
Insects described in 1839
Taxonomy articles created by Polbot